The Weatherman LP is the first album by Dilated Peoples member Evidence, released March 20, 2007 by ABB.

Background 
Besides Evidence, other rappers on the album include Phonte, Planet Asia, Rapper Big Pooh, Defari and Slug. The album also features vocals by Noelle Scaggs, Res and Kobe. The majority of the album was produced by Evidence and his bandmate in Dilated Peoples, DJ Babu, Sid Roams and The Alchemist. Other producers include DJ Khalil, Jake One.

Singles 
Two singles were released from the album: "Mr. Slow Flow" and "All Said & Done". Neither charted, but the album did spend one week on the Billboard Independent Albums chart, at number 42. Music videos were created for "Mr. Slow Flow" and "Chase the Clouds Away".

Track listing

Chart history

References

External links 
 

Evidence (musician) albums
2007 albums
Albums produced by the Alchemist (musician)
Albums produced by DJ Khalil
Albums produced by Jake One
Albums produced by Evidence (musician)